Kuala Lumpur–Rawang Highway, Federal Route 1, also known as Jalan Kuching and Jalan Ipoh, is a major highway in Klang Valley region, Malaysia.

History
The most controversial development of the FT1 highway in Kuala Lumpur was the toll collection at Jalan Kuching FT1. The nine-year concession of Jalan Kuching FT1 was awarded to Kamunting Corporation Berhad, signed on 15 April 1985. In the original concessionaire agreement, Kamunting Corporation Berhad was required to build an interchange at Kepong Roundabout and to upgrade the Jalan Kepong FT54, in return for the nine-year toll collection rights starting from 1987 until 1996. However, in 1987, the concessionaire agreement was amended, and Kamunting Corporation Berhad was required to add two more lanes from the existing four lanes along Jalan Kuching FT1, resulting another 7-year extension of toll concession which was ended in 2003. The toll collection at Jalan Kuching FT1 had sparked fury among Kuala Lumpurian motorists, and numerous protests were held to urge the government to end the toll collection there. The toll collection at Jalan Kuching FT1 was finally abolished on 8 January 2003.

The Segambut roundabout was upgraded into four-level interchange. Construction began in 2004 and was completed by the end of 2006. The project was led by Malaysian Public Works Department (JKR), Kuala Lumpur City Hall (DBKL) and the main contractor was Ahmad Zaki Resources Berhad (AZRB). This four-level interchange was opened to traffic on 26 February 2007.

The 2-lane single-carriageway section between Bandar Baru Selayang and Templer's Park was upgraded to 4-lane dual-carriageway with emergency lanes and several U-turns. Construction started in 2006 and was expected to be completed in 2009.

List of interchanges

References

See also
 Federal Route 1
 Cheras Highway
 Kuala Lumpur

Highways in Malaysia
Expressways and highways in the Klang Valley